Marcello Ferrada de Noli (born 25 July 1943) is a Swedish professor emeritus of epidemiology, and medicine doktor in psychiatry (Ph.D. Karolinska Institute, Sweden). He was Research Fellow and lecturer at Harvard Medical School, and was later head of the research group of International and Cross-Cultural Injury Epidemiology at the Karolinska Institute until 2009. Ferrada de Noli is known for his investigations on suicidal behaviour associated with severe trauma. He is the founder of the NGO Swedish Doctors for Human Rights, SWEDHR. He is also a writer, and painting artist.

Academic career
Studies: Bachillerato universitario (Chile) in philosophy, Pontifical Catholic University of Valparaiso, 1962. University of Concepción, 1962–1968. Profesor de Filosofía degree, University of Chile, 1969. Licentiate in Medical Sciences (psychiatry), 1994, and PhD in psychiatry in 1996, Karolinska Institute, Sweden. Postdoctoral in Social Medicine, Harvard Medical School, 1997–1998.

Ferrada de Noli was full professor of psychology at the University of Chile, Arica, 1970 and an invited professor at Universidad Autónoma de Nuevo León, México, 1972. At the time of the 1973 Chilean coup d'état he was full professor of psychosocial methods at the University of Concepción.

Ferrada de Noli held various research positions at the Karolinska Institute in Stockholm, from assistant researcher at the Social and Forensic Psychiatry Department (1987) to Senior Research Scientist at the Department of Clinical Neuroscience, Psychiatry Section (1997).  professor of health psychology, University of Tromsø, Norway 1997. He qualified as a full professor of health promotion, and as a professor of cross-cultural psychology, at the University of Bergen, Norway, 1999, and was thereafter invited professor of cross-cultural psychology at the Norwegian University of Science and Technology, Norway, 2000. In Sweden, he was full professor of public-health epidemiology at the University of Gävle, position shared at Karolinska Institute, Department of Social Medicine 2002–2007. Invited professor of International Health, University of Gävle, 2007. Professor Emeritus (title), 2007. He was named affiliate professor at the Medical Faculty, University of Chile, 2006.

His work has been cited in about 2.390 scientific articles and books, In the journal Clinical Psychology Review (2009), three authors wrote that Ferrada de Noli and co-workers had found a new pathway in the pathogenesis of suicidal behaviour associated with PTSD. The review concluded that Ferrada de Noli and his co-workers "demonstrated that among refugees with PTSD, major depression was not substantially associated with heightened levels of suicidal behaviour". Meaning that the path to severe suicide attempts in PTSD victims was not mediated by depression - as it was thought before - but linked directly to PTSD. The discovery indicated modifications in prevention and treatment of suicidal behaviour. Another finding was significant correlations between specific methods in suicidal behavior and methods used in torture inflicted to prisoners later diagnosed with PTSD. In the book Suicide and the Holocaust, David Lester referred to that finding, and summarized: "for example those subjected to water torture thought of using drowning". He established ethnicity as significant risk factor for suicidal deaths in Sweden, and found statistically significant markers associating Socioeconomic Status (SES) and suicidal behaviour in Sweden. From 2004 to 2007 and 2007-2012 he was appointed by the Swedish government alternate scientific member of the Swedish Central Ethical Review Board Etikprövningsnämnd for research.

Political activism 

The Swedish newspaper Dagens Nyheter (2008) described Ferrada de Noli as "left-liberal", and newspaper Ystads Allehanda (2013) writes, "Left-liberal. But his conservative past continued to chase him". In newspaper Expressen (2018) Ferrada de Noli declared he participated as "social-libertarian" in the foundation of the guerrilla organization MIR in 1965, besides having been briefly active in the Swedish Liberal Party during the 1980s – which at the time had a social-liberal profile in Swedish politics.

In an op-ed in Dagens Nyheter (2015), Ferrada de Noli advocated for Sweden to return being a neutral country "as it was in Olof Palme's times", and "resuming an active role in the work for peace and respect for human rights in the world". Ferrada de Noli has been referred to as one of the founders of the Revolutionary Left Movement (Chile), MIR (1965), and co-author of the "Political-Military Thesis" approved in the foundation congress. MIR was a far left guerrilla organization with roots in the Socialist Party of Chile, where he had participated in the regional board of its youth organization in Concepción. MIR was considered Pinochet regime's "number one counterinsurgency target". 
 He was detained several times by the government authorities, and was among the 13 leaders of MIR listed in the national arrest warrant issued by the Chilean authorities prosecuting MIR's subversion activities in 1969. He was finally captured and held incommunicado in Concepción's Prison.

After the aborted MIR resistance to the military in Concepción ensuing the 1973 Chilean coup d'état, Ferrada de Noli was captured and held prisoner in Quiriquina Island. In a photo of the epoch in newspaper La Tercera, he appeared among prisoners described as "extremists that have attacked the military forces with fire weapons".

In 1974 he went to Italy to participate as a witness at the Russell Tribunal in Rome, which reviewed human rights transgressions by the Government Junta of Chile.

In Sweden, he continued in MIR until 1977 as head of MIR and Junta Coordinadora Revolucionaria counter-intelligence activity in Scandinavia, undertaking aimed the monitoring of Operation Condor. In 1976 he started working as psychotherapist at health services for political refugees in Stockholm County, and 1989 in crisis therapy provided at the Swedish Red Cross Project for traumatized and torture-survivor refugees. During mid-80s he participated in the Swedish Liberal Party.

Following retirement, Ferrada de Noli founded the online magazine The Indicter , dealing with "human rights and geopolitical issues", as read in the magazine's banner.

Controversies

Early controversies

Earlier academic controversies have involved articles in Swedish medical journals and media on his public opposition to the Swedish diagnose "utbrändhet" (work-related stress 'burnout'), which he said didn't have epidemiological ground. After he wrote in DN that one risk factor for "utbrändhet" in women could be stress caused by a double working load, at the job and then at home –contradicting the notion of an advanced Swedish gender equality, Minister Mona Sahlin commented that his thesis was "a bid insulting, to say the least". Later in 2005, Aftonbladet published a half front-page headline, "Professor in attack against the burned-out". It referred an interview where Ferrada de Noli stated that to be displeased with a job cannot be equated with a medical diagnosis, and a new debate ensued in the Swedish media.

In 1998, at that time professor in Norway, Ferrada de Noli requested the legal extradition of General Augusto Pinochet, to be judged in a European court on allegations of torture and war crimes.

Assange case

Ferrada de Noli has been criticized in the Swedish media for his public defence of Julian Assange. He published the book Sweden vs. Assange. Human Rights Issues, claiming that the case was instead political. In 2011, via Jennifer Robinson, he submitted to the London Court deliberating the extradition of Assange, a testimony based on his investigation "Swedish Trial by Media". In 2012, Swedish Radio said in a broadcast that Ferrada de Noli has implicated "a social democratic feminist working together with 'arms-(exports) companies' trying to get Assange". Ferrada Noli denied that and asked Swedish Radio for a retraction.
In a report by the Italian newspaper L'Eco di Bergamo (January 2019), he was asked why he defended Assange's deeds "instead of regard it illegal or criminal"; he replied,  "According to International Law, what could instead be considered as criminal is what Assange has denounced", In 2019, Libertarian Books Europe published his second book on the case, Sweden's Geopolitical Case Against Assange 2010-2019.

Questioning of reported evidence on the alleged gas attacks in Khan Shaykhun

In 2017, Ferrada de Noli elicited international controversy  over his publications and statements questioning the evidence around allegations of gas attacks in Syria by government forces. In December 2017, the Russian permanent representative to the UN submitted to the United Nations Security Council (UNSC) an article by him in his magazine The Indicter, in which he alleged epidemiological bias in the report issued by the OPCW-UN Joint Investigative Mechanism on the Khan Shaykhun chemical attack of April 2017 in Syria. SWEDHR publications in The Indicter authored by Ferrada de Noli have been cited or included in documents submitted at the UNSC by the Russian and Syrian ambassadors, added the Russian envoys at the OPCW or the ambassador to the UK.

European mainstream media, e.g. Le Figaro, ARD/BR, and Der Spiegel, raised criticism of his geopolitical articles published by SWEDHR and in The Indicter. Dagens Nyheter, together with other Swedish newspapers, e.g. Aftonbladet Expressen, Göteborgs-Posten, Västerbottens-Kuriren, Uppsala Nya Tidning, also addressed Ferrada de Noli's "frequent interviews in Russian media and Russian-government international propaganda channels", and questioned the mentions of his work and his organization SWEDHR at press briefings of the Ministry of Foreign Affairs of the Russian Federation. Ferrada de Noli contested the media criticism in the journal of the Swedish Medical Association Läkartidningen, claiming that SWEDHR is "absolutely independent". In an interview on the subject, he declared, "We only have our own line. Whether that coincide or not with the positions of different countries, that is not our intention".

Geneva Press Club
The  organized a conference in November 2017 to debate events in Syria. Reporters Without Borders (RWB) called for its cancellation, arguing against an invitation to Ferrada de Noli to hold a keynote address, being "president of an organization that, according with our information, acts as a tool of Russian propaganda." Ferrada De Noli called RWB on Twitter to "publish your evidence now, or shame". Guy Mettan, president of the Geneva Press Club, dismissed the attacks as "not worth of journalism". The conference ultimately took place with police protection due to reported threats.

Skripal case

At early events around the Skripal poison incident in Salisbury, Ferrada de Noli was subject of new criticism in Danish TV and Swedish media (e.g. Danish newspaper Dagens Nyheter). Ferrada de Noli's thesis was that the poison Novichok would have been developed in Uzbekistan, not in Russia, and its possession by other countries could not be ruled out. According to Dagens Nyheter, he would have declared in an interview done with him by the newspaper April 2, 2018, that the Skripal incident could be a case of False flag in anticipating an eventual confrontation sought by the United Kingdom against Russia.

Covid-19 pandemic 
As professor emeritus in epidemiology, Ferrada de Noli has opposed the herd immunity strategy, said to have being implemented in Sweden. According to him, that approach would have been a main factor for the "thousands of unnecessary deaths" among the elderly in Sweden 2020. Instead, he publicly advocated for stricter lockdown measures, wideppread testting and mass vaccination. His statements were mentioned in European news and interviews, e.g. Il Foglio, which called him "celebre epidemiologo". The Swedish Enterprise Media Monitor  included Ferrada de Noli in the top-ten list of professors and experts that participated in the COVID-19 media debat in Sweden 2020. Notwithstanding, mainstream media in Sweden criticised him sternly; e.g. newspaper Expressen named him, together with Cecilia Söderberg-Nauclér and Lena Einhorn, a "saboteur" of the Public Health Agency of Sweden.

Italian media reported that Ferrada de Noli was to donate, at his own expense, 740 doses of Sputnik vaccine to the survived elderly in the Lombardy town of San Giovanni Bianco, one epicentre of the pandemic in Bergamo province 2020. Italian local authorities first welcomed the initiative. At that time, November 2020, Sputnik was the only vaccine available in the market. Nevertheless, as Corriere della Sera later reported, his donation could not be accepted because European Medicines Agency EMA had not approved Sputnik for its use in the EU. The news about Ferrada de Noli's initiative had also extensive coverage in Russian media, including the government's gazette.  Later, Swedish newspaper SvD suggested he was part of a Russian state campaign to discredit the Anglo/Swedish AstraZeneca vaccine. This led to a libel-report by Ferrada de Noli against SvD at Sweden's Media Ombudsman. In November 2021, he publicly advocated for mandatory vaccination against COVID-19,  "If I had my way, I would make getting vaccinated – with the exception of clinical cases – obligatory for all citizens of all countries".

Awards 
Universidad Autónoma de Nuevo León, México, 1972: Mención Especial al Mérito. 
Instituto Superior de Ciencias Médicas de la Habana, Cuba, 2005. "Por su contribución pionera a la investigación epidemiológica". 
University of Chile, 2006. Professor Agregado. "En mérito a la colaboración en los programas docentes"  
University of Gävle, Sweden, 2007. "Title of Distinction Professor Emeritus. In value of meritorious academic services".
Swedish Reward medal "For Zealous and Devoted Service of the Realm".

Family 
Marcello Ferrada de Noli was born in Copiapó, Chile, in family of Italian origin, descendants to the nobleman and navigator Antonio de Noli. His father was a company owner and retired officer in the armed forces, and his mother was a professor at the University of Concepción. He is the father of seven children, among them Swedish writers Caroline Ringskog Ferrada-Noli and Nicholas Ringskog Ferrada-Noli. He lives in Bergamo, Italy.

Arte de Noli 
First paint exhibitions in Europe at Centro Studi Artistici La Giada, Rome at Feltrinelli Editore, Rome 1974,  and at Galleria Moran. In Sweden, at Kulturhuset, Stockholm, 1977, an exhibition of his paintings with political content was organized by Amnesty International. The theme of the exhibition was "The Desaparecidos", referring to the missed prisoners ensuing the 1973 Chilean coup d'état. The Embassy of Chile in Stockholm organized in 2004 a retrospective art exhibition with Ferrada de Noli's paintings and portrait works. His signature Arte de Noli.

Books 
 1962 Cantos de Rebelde Esperanza (Poetry) 
1967 No, no me digas señor (Play, on stage Teatro Concepción 1967, published 2015)  scanned
1969 Universidad y Superstructura (Philosophy) University of Concepcion, thesis
1972 Teoría y Método de la Concientización (Social psychology) 
 1982 The Theory of Alienation and the Diathesis of Psychosomatic Pathology (Philosophy, psychiatry)  
 1993 Chalice of Love (Philosophy, fiction) 
 1995 Psychiatric and Forensic Findings in Definite and Undetermined Suicides (Epidemiology, forensic psychiatry), Karolinska Institutet, Dept Clinical Neuroscience, Psychiatry Section, 1995.
 1996 Posttraumatic Stress Disorder in Immigrants to Sweden (Psychiatry),Karolinska Institutet, Dept Clinical Neuroscience, 1996. 
2003 Efter tortyr (Contributor author) (Torture, psychiatry), Centre for Survivors of Torture and Trauma (CTD), Estocolmo. Liber, 1993. ISBN 91-634-0678-0
2005 Fighting Pinochet (Testimony, resistance). ISBN 978-91-88747-00-6
2007 Theses on the cultural premises of pseudoscience (Epistemology) 
2008 Kejsarens utbrända kläder (Epidemiology, psychiatry) ISBN 978-91-88747-01-3
 2009 Oxford Textbook of Suicidology and Suicide Prevention, Oxford University Press, 1a ed., 2009. Print .(Contributor author) (Psychiatry)
 2013 Da Noli a Capo Verde (Contributor author) (History) 
 2013 Antonio de Noli And The Beginning Of The New World Discoveries (Editor)(Contributor author)(History) 
 2014 Sweden VS. Assange. Human Rights Issues (Geopolitics, human rights) 
 2018 Aurora Política de Bautista van Schouwen (Book chapter) 
 2018 Con Bautista van Schouwen (Political history) 
 2019 Pablo de Rokha y la joven generación del MIR (Political history) 
 2019 Sweden's Geopolitical Case Against Assange 2010-2019 (Geopolitics, history, human rights) 
 2020 Rebeldes Con Causa (Political history, human rights) 
2021 Lo Paradojal de la Vida. Reflexiones dialécticas (Philosophy) 
2021 Los que fundamos el MIR (Political history) 
2021 Amore e Resistenza (Poetry) 
2021 La mujer de Walter y otras historias (Fiction) 
2021 Kejsarens utbrända kläder (Epidemiology, psychiatry) 
2021 Si Bemol de Combate (Poetry) 
2021 Esistenza Dialettica (Italian translation of Lo Paradojal de la Vida) 
2021 Mi Lucha Contra Pinochet (Spanish translation of Fighting Pinochet )

References

External links
Ferrada de Noli homepage
Academic CV
Arte de Noli

1943 births
Academic staff of the Karolinska Institute
Living people
Swedish political activists
Swedish epidemiologists
Swedish psychiatrists
Academic staff of the University of Chile
Chilean emigrants to Sweden